Octavian Ionescu may refer to:

 Octavian Ionescu (footballer, born 1990), Romanian football center back
 Octavian Ionescu (footballer, born 1949), Romanian football midfielder